The B5470 is a road in  England, running from Chapel-en-le-Frith, Derbyshire, to Macclesfield, Cheshire, via Whaley Bridge. The hilly and winding section between Whaley Bridge and Macclesfield is often called 'The Highwayman' after a prominent roadside pub, now closed. Much of the route follows former turnpike roads through a scenic area of the Peak District National Park.

Route

The B5470 starts in Town End on the eastern side of Chapel-en-le-Frith at a junction with the A624, which connects it to the A6. It then runs westwards, forming the main street of Chapel-en-le-Frith. It then continues to the hamlet of Tunstead Milton after which it runs along the valley of the Randall Carr in a series of sweeping bends to Whaley Bridge. This length of the road is generally level and prone to flooding in wet weather.

In Whaley Bridge the B5470 crosses the A5004 at the Horwich End traffic lights. It then climbs rapidly out of Whaley Bridge to the village of Kettleshulme, Cheshire. The descent from Charles Head to the Harrop Brook is one of the few straight portions of the road. It then climbs again to the former Highwayman Inn on a section that is particularly prone to accidents due to misjudged overtaking.

From the Highwayman the road descends through the village of Rainow, Cheshire, and then climbs the south edge of Kerridge Hill before beginning its final descent to Macclesfield, where it terminates at a junction with the A523.

Use

The B5470 is one of only two routes entering Macclesfield from the east. As well as being used as a main commuter route from the towns of northwest Derbyshire it also carries a high number of heavy goods vehicles and tourist traffic into the Peak District National Park, the last including cyclists and walkers. The road also forms part of the well-known 'Cat And Fiddle – Long Hill – Highwayman' triangle, which is particularly attractive to motorcyclists because of the frequency and severity of the bends. Given this mix of usage, the number and sharpness of the bends and the fact that it is not uncommon to encounter straying livestock on the road it is necessary to employ a great deal of caution. Severe winter weather can also make the road extremely hazardous.

History
The road follows former turnpike roads from Chapel-en-le-Frith to Whaley Bridge, built in 1727, and from Whaley Bridge to Macclesfield, built in 1770. There were toll bars at Hurdsfield, Rainow and Fernilee, and in 1825–26 the tolls raised a total of £580 (modern equivalent £). Several original milestones along the route are designated Listed Buildings. Responsibility for maintenance of turnpike roads was transferred to the county councils on their formation in 1888.

References

External links

  The B5470 on Google Maps
 
 A cycle ride on the B5470

Roads in England
Roads in Cheshire
Roads in Derbyshire